Leap of Faith is an American single-camera sitcom that aired on NBC in early 2002, right after Friends on NBC's Thursday comedy block at 8:30 PM EST, as part of Must See TV.

Plot

Cast
Sarah Paulson as Faith Wardwell
Ken Marino as Andy
Lisa Edelstein as Patty
Tim Meadows as Lucas
Regina King as Cynthia 
Brad Rowe as Dan Murphy
Jill Clayburgh as Cricket Wardwell

Episodes

Broadcast
Friends was in its eighth season and was the number one show on television and ratings expectations were very high for the television that followed its timeslot. Inside Schwartz filled the time slot before Leap of Faith, but Inside Schwartz was canceled after six episodes despite averaging 14.6 million viewers. After Leap of Faith finished airing, the timeslot was ultimately filled with repeats of Friends for the rest of the season; the repeats averaged 18.6 million viewers.

Ratings
The series averaged 16.5 million viewers for the season.

References

External links
 

2002 American television series debuts
2002 American television series endings
2000s American single-camera sitcoms
NBC original programming
Television shows set in New York City
English-language television shows
Television series by Universal Television